Brian Hatfield Henninger (born October 19, 1962) is an American professional golfer who played on the PGA Tour and the Nationwide Tour. He has won two tournaments on the PGA Tour and three on the Nationwide Tour.

Early life
Henninger was born in Sacramento, California. He attended the University of Southern California and walked on to the golf team there.

Professional career
Henninger turned pro in 1987, playing on the developmental Golden State Golf Tour. After winning three tournaments on the Nationwide Tour in 1992, he joined the PGA Tour in 1993. Henninger's first PGA tournament win came in a playoff at the 1994 Deposit Guaranty Golf Classic in Madison, Mississippi, which was shortened by rain to only 36 holes (this win predated current PGA Tour rules which require 54 holes to be played for a tournament to be considered "official"). His only other PGA Tour win came in the same tournament (renamed as the Southern Farm Bureau Classic) in 1999 when he won by three strokes in another rain-shortened affair. Henninger's best result in a major championship was in the 1995 Masters Tournament, in which he shared the lead after 54 holes but closed with a disappointing 76, leaving him in a tie for 10th place.

Henninger's results in the early 2000s were disappointing, and he lost his PGA Tour card after the 2002 season. He spent the majority of the remaining decade on the Nationwide Tour, playing in PGA Tour events whenever possible as an alternate, through exemptions, or past champion status. After turning 50, Henninger joined the Champions Tour.

Henninger was one of the primary subjects of John Feinstein's 1995 book, A Good Walk Spoiled, which detailed life inside the ropes of the PGA Tour.

Personal life
Henninger resides in Wilsonville, Oregon, with his wife and three children. His Brian Henninger Foundation has donated over $700,000 to numerous causes, mostly located in the Pacific Northwest.

Amateur wins
this list may be incomplete
1986 Pacific Coast Amateur

Professional wins (6)

PGA Tour wins (2)

*Note: Tournament shortened to 36/54 holes.

PGA Tour playoff record (1–0)

Ben Hogan Tour wins (3)

Ben Hogan Tour playoff record (1–0)

Other wins (1)

Results in major championships

Note: Henninger never played in The Open Championship.

CUT = missed the half-way cut
"T" = tied

See also
1992 Ben Hogan Tour graduates
1996 PGA Tour Qualifying School graduates

References

External links
Official site

American male golfers
USC Trojans men's golfers
PGA Tour golfers
PGA Tour Champions golfers
Korn Ferry Tour graduates
Golfers from Sacramento, California
Golfers from Oregon
People from Wilsonville, Oregon
Sportspeople from the Portland metropolitan area
1962 births
Living people